Captain Harold Thomas Cawley (12 June 1878 – 23 September 1915) was a British barrister, Liberal Party politician and soldier.

Background
Born at Crumpsall, he was the second son of Frederick Cawley, 1st Baron Cawley and his wife Elizabeth Smith, daughter of John Smith. His younger brother was Oswald Cawley. Cawley was educated at Rugby School and then at New College, Oxford, where he graduated with a Master of Arts. He was called to the Bar by the Inner Temple in 1902 and went to the Northern Circuit, working in Lancashire. Two years later he joined the 2nd Volunteer Battalion, Manchester Regiment.

Career

In 1910, Cawley entered the British House of Commons for Heywood, and a year later he was appointed Parliamentary Private Secretary to the Home Secretary Reginald McKenna. On the outbreak of World war I in 1914 he served with his Territorial Force battalion (now the 6th Battalion, Manchester Regiment and became aide de camp to Major-General William Douglas, the officer commanding 42nd (East Lancashire) Division.

Death

The 42nd Division went to Gallipoli in 1915. During September the Turks exploded a series of mines in front of the British trench known as the 'Gridiron' and damaging its defences. Repairs after one mine on 22 September were covered by a bombing party of 1/6th Battalion Manchester Regiment who held the lip of the crater. The same day the Royal Engineers exploded a counter-mine and the Manchesters rushed the crater and built a barrier across it. Captain Cawley, serving with 1/6th Bn, was killed that night by a Turkish sniper, and the crater became known as 'Cawley's Crater'. Before his death, he sent a letter to his father, at that time representative of Prestwich in the Parliament of the United Kingdom. 

As a Member of Parliament the letter was not subject to military censorship, and it reported the mishandling of the Dardanelles campaign in some detail. Cawley is buried at Lancashire Landing Cemetery in Gallipoli.

It was in memory of Harold and two other sons – Oswald and John – who died in the war that their father endowed a ward at Ancoats Hospital, Manchester, in 1919 at a cost of £10,000. 

All three brothers are commemorated on the Parliamentary War Memorial in Westminster Hall. Harold and Oswald, on Panel 8, are among the 22 MPs that died during World War I to be named on that memorial. John, included on the memorial as the son of an MP, appears on Panel 2 of the memorial. Harold Cawley is one of 19 MPs who fell in the war who are commemorated by heraldic shields in the Commons Chamber. 

A further act of commemoration came with the unveiling in 1932 of a manuscript-style illuminated book of remembrance for the House of Commons, which includes short biographical accounts of the life and death of the Cawley brothers.

References

External links 
 
Church memorials

1878 births
1915 deaths
Alumni of New College, Oxford
British Army personnel of World War I
British military personnel killed in World War I
Harold
English barristers
Manchester Regiment officers
Members of the Inner Temple
Members of the Parliament of the United Kingdom for English constituencies
People educated at Rugby School
UK MPs 1910
UK MPs 1910–1918
Younger sons of barons
19th-century English lawyers